Riverdale Road Bridge is a covered bridge spanning the Grand River in Morgan Township, Ashtabula County, Ohio, United States. The bridge, one of currently 16 drivable bridges in Ashtabula county, is a single span Town truss design. During its renovation in 1981, the floor was rebuilt and glue-laminated wood girders were added. Previously, center steel bracing had been replaced under the bridge in 1945. In 1987, a new concrete abutment for additional support was added after the road at the east end of the bridge washed out.

History
1874 – Bridge constructed
1945 – Center steel bracing replaced
1981 – Bridge renovated
1987 – Concrete abutment added at west end after road washed out

Dimensions
Span: 
Length: 
Width: 
Height: 
Overhead clearance:

Gallery

See also
List of Ashtabula County covered bridges

References

External links
Ohio Covered Bridges List
Ohio Historic Bridge Association

Covered bridges in Ashtabula County, Ohio
Bridges completed in 1874
Road bridges in Ohio
Wooden bridges in Ohio
Lattice truss bridges in the United States